Steve King (born September 8, 1948) is a Canadian retired professional ice hockey right winger who played 136 games in the World Hockey Association for the Ottawa Nationals and Toronto Toros in 1972-74.

King was born in Toronto, Ontario. As a youth, he played in the 1961 Quebec International Pee-Wee Hockey Tournament with Toronto Dileo. Before turning professional, he competed internationally with the Canada men's national ice hockey team that won the 1969 World Ice Hockey Championships.

References

External links

1948 births
Living people
Canadian ice hockey forwards
Ice hockey people from Toronto
Ottawa Nationals players
Toronto Toros players
Tulsa Oilers (1964–1984) players
Canadian expatriate ice hockey players in the United States